Maslovare is a village in the central Bosnia, Bosnia and Herzegovina, Republika Srpska , Kotor Varoš  Municipality.

Geography
Maslovare is the administrative center of the Local Community. It is located on the river Kruševica, below the eastern slopes of the mountain Borja (1,077 m), at 400–418 meters above sea level. From the north are the slopes of Uzlomac (1,018 m) Mountain, from the east – Rađeno brdo  (967 m), west - Bodnjički Vis. On the south, Krusevica and Vrbanja river vallies there are the slopes of mountains chain Čemernica – Vlasic (Borci, 814 m). Bodnjički Vis (641 m) spreads from the mouth of Krusevice into Vrbanja to the mouth Jezerka in the same river. On it is a contemporary TV repeater of BHT.

Through Maslovare passes the road Banja Luka – Kotor Varoš – Teslić – Matuzići – Doboj, where this communication comes to M-17 (as Corridor Vc). In this village hall (in the Obodnik ) is the exit of local roads for Šiprage and Kruševo Brdo. The distance to Banja Luka is around 53 km.

Population

Municipality populations of  Kotor Varoš County,  1953

Notable people
Nevenka Petrić (1927-2015), writer, educationalist and expert for family planning and gender issues.

Sources 
 Book: "Nacionalni sastav stanovništva - Rezultati za Republiku po opštinama i naseljenim mjestima 1991.", statistički bilten br. 234, Izdanje Državnog zavoda za statistiku Republike Bosne i Hercegovine, Sarajevo.
Internet - Source: "Popis po mjesnim zajednicama" - https://web.archive.org/web/20131005002409/http://www.fzs.ba/Podaci/nacion%20po%20mjesnim.pdf
 Mape, aerodromi i vremenska situacija lokacija (-{Fallingrain}-)
http://www.maplandia.com/bosnia-and-herzegovina/republika-srpska/maslovare-44-33-56-n-17-32-1-e/ Google satelitska mapa

References

Populated places in Kotor Varoš
Villages in Republika Srpska